Angel Shijoy is an Indian voice actress who mainly uses her voice in Malayalam film and advertising industry. She has been lending her voice for cinema, short films, Documentaries  and advertisements since age eight.  She has lent her voice in more than 6000 advertisements including commercials and voice overs in Malayalam and English. Her voice was also used in the title track "Nattilengum Paattayi" for Radio Mango. Also, she is the promotional voice artist for Gold 101.3FM based in dubai since 10 years. She had won the Kerala State TV Award twice by dubbing for tele serials in 2013 and 2016 and  Kerala State Film Award for Best Dubbing Artist in 2015 for Haram.

Career 
She started her career when she was eight years old for Malayalam soap operas. She has dubbed in several Malayalam television serials before her movie career as a dubbing artist. She has dubbed for lead female actresses in many Malayalam films.

Filmography

As voice artist

Short films & Serial Opera
Monnamidam - Rachana Narayanankutty
Adheena - Mansi Joshi
Tag - Anju Kurian
The Other Half - Veda Hrudya Nadendla
Burn My Body - Aparna Nair
Hridyam - Sharanya Chinnasamy
Anna Kareena - Catherine Reji(ep 32-109)

Documentary 
Cybertrap : The Dark Side Of Social Media Documentary (2020)

Awards
Kerala State Film Awards for best dubbing artist- Haram (2015)
 Kerala State Television Award for best dubbing artist- vishudha mariam thresya (2013)
 Kerala State Television Award for best Dubbing artist- ThapaswiniVishudhaAvuprasya (2016)

See also
List of Indian Dubbing Artists
Kerala State Film Award for Best Dubbing Artist

References

External links
 
 
 

Living people
Indian voice actresses
Year of birth missing (living people)